Garry MacDonald (born 12 August 1956) is a New Zealand cricketer. He played in eighteen first-class matches for Canterbury from 1984 to 1991.

See also
 List of Canterbury representative cricketers

References

External links
 

1956 births
Living people
New Zealand cricketers
Canterbury cricketers
Cricketers from Blenheim, New Zealand